Al Rai or Alrai may refer to:

 Al Rai (Kuwaiti newspaper), a Kuwaiti newspaper
 Al Ra'i (Jordanian newspaper), a Jordanian newspaper
 Erraï, defunct Tunisian weekly newspaper (1977–1987)

 Alrai, traditional Arabic name of Gamma Cephei, a binary star system in the Cepheus constellation
 al-Rai, Syria, a town in Aleppo Governorate, northern Syria